Juris Jaudzems (born 23 February 1963) is a Latvian bobsledder. He competed in the four man event at the 1988 Winter Olympics, representing the Soviet Union.

References

1963 births
Living people
Latvian male bobsledders
Olympic bobsledders of the Soviet Union
Bobsledders at the 1988 Winter Olympics
People from Jēkabpils